Leonardo Fabián Rivero Bueno (born November 12, 1983 in Paysandú, Uruguay) is a Uruguayan footballer currently playing for Wilstermann.

Teams
  Paysandú Bella Vista 2003
  Deportes Puerto Montt 2004
  Deportes Antofagasta 2004
  Pelita Jaya 2005–2006
  Atenas de San Carlos 2006–2007
  Deportivo Quito 2007–2008
  Cerro Largo 2009
  FBC Melgar 2010–2011
  Cienciano 2012
  Gimnasia y Esgrima de Jujuy 2013–2014
  Cerro Largo 2014
  Wilstermann 2014-

References
 

1983 births
Living people
Footballers from Paysandú
Uruguayan footballers
Atenas de San Carlos players
Cerro Largo F.C. players
FBC Melgar footballers
S.D. Quito footballers
C.D. Antofagasta footballers
Puerto Montt footballers
Cienciano footballers
Gimnasia y Esgrima de Jujuy footballers
Peruvian Primera División players
Uruguayan expatriate footballers
Expatriate footballers in Chile
Expatriate footballers in Peru
Expatriate footballers in Ecuador
Expatriate footballers in Indonesia
Expatriate footballers in Argentina
Uruguayan expatriate sportspeople in Chile
Uruguayan expatriate sportspeople in Peru
Uruguayan expatriate sportspeople in Ecuador
Uruguayan expatriate sportspeople in Indonesia
Uruguayan expatriate sportspeople in Argentina
Pelita Bandung Raya players
Association football forwards